
Gmina Grodzisko Dolne is a rural gmina (administrative district) in Leżajsk County, Subcarpathian Voivodeship, in south-eastern Poland.

Villages
Gmina Grodzisko Dolne contains the villages and settlements of Chodaczów, Grodzisko Dolne, Grodzisko Górne, Grodzisko Nowe, Grodzisko-Miasteczko, Laszczyny, Opaleniska, Podlesie, Wólka Grodziska and Zmysłówka.

Neighbouring gminas
Gmina Grodzisko Dolne is bordered by the gminas of Białobrzegi, Leżajsk, Tryńcza and Żołynia.

References

Polish official population figures 2006

Grodzisko Dolne
Leżajsk County